Kānpura is a town in  Ajmer, Rajasthan, India.

References

Ajmer district
Villages in Ajmer district